Bala Ganapathi William, known professionally as BGW is a Malaysian actor, film director, television host, singer and producer. Bala Ganapathi William is the founder of BGW Studios companies which specialise in advertising, Malaysian Tamil film production (MKU) and film distribution, music record label and digital content.

Early life and education
William was born  in Sungai Petani, Kedah.

Movies
William's feature films as a hero are Neeyum Naanum. BGW directed the film under BGW Studios in association with HK Network.

Music
William made his debut as a singer in his first single titled "Kaadhal Enbathu Saabama". The music was composed by Lawrence Soosai. The cast of the music video includes Bala Ganapathi, Subashini Asokan, Srithika Sri & Mugen Rao. Rapper Sheezay and Santesh penned the song's lyrics. The song was on the Malaysian Top 10 Hits chart for more than 10 weeks, and it was also the number one song on the chart continuously for seven weeks in THR Raaga.

Film and TV
As for 2020, William acted as lead male on more than 20 Malaysia Tamil Movies, 1,000 episodes of TV programs TV series locally and internationally. He first appeared on television in 2009 in a program titled 'Alaram 2' on ASTRO Vaanavil, at the age of 19. He made his debut as a host on a TV anchor in a dance competition titled Yuttha Medai which was previously known as Aattam 100 Vagai on ASTRO Vaanavil in November 2012. He made his acting debut in a TV Drama titled Vazhkai Valvatharke which was aired on ASTRO Vaanavil in 2012. Alarum Pookkal, also known as 3 Doctors is a drama that was aired on the RTM TV2 channel in 2013. It was the first drama featuring BGW as the male lead.

Rasikka Rusikka TV Show elevated William's career a bit more further in 2014. In the fourth season of Rasikka Rusikka, William traveled to Thailand and Singapore too. William completed 5 seasons of Rasikka Rusikka which 78 episodes in total for the past 5 years.

In 2014, BGW worked as an actor on the Singapore Tamil TV series Annamalai, which aired on Mediacorp Vasantham TV. Singapore TV host Nithya Rao also appeared in the series. William also worked as an assistant director and casting director for the series.

Awards
In 2017, William received the Best Host/Announcer Award for 2016 and 2017 from the Malaysian MGR Youth Association and Persatuan Peminat ASTRO Vaanavil Negeri Kedah. The award was presented to him by the popular Indian actor/director K. Bhagyaraj. The ceremony took place at SP Inn Hotel, Sungai Petani Kedah on 29 July 2017.

On 29 December 2017, William received the Nadigar Thilagam Sivaji Ganesan Award as Most Promising Artist of the Year 2017. This award was presented to him by Sivaji Ganesan Cultural Society, Malaysia.

On 31 January 2019, William received the Cinefest Malaysia Award as Best Debut Director for his movie titled Neeyum Naanum.

In April 2019, William received twin award from MICA Awards 2019 as the Best Debut Director & Best Movie for Neeyum Naanum.

Film production 
 Goodbye | Short Film (Director & Cinematographer) | 2014
 Annamalai Season 1 | Vasantham MediaCorp Singapore (Assistant Director & Casting Director) | 2014
 Annamalai Season 2 | Vasantham MediaCorp Singapore (Assistant Director & Casting Director) | 2015
 Annamalai Season 3 | Vasantham MediaCorp Singapore (Assistant Director & Casting Director) | 2016
 Manggalyam Tanthunanena Telemovie | Astro Vaanavil (Producer – BGW) | 2016
 Neeyum Naanum – Feature Film | Malaysian Tamil Movie (Film Director) (Production & Distribution by BGW) | 2017

Music videos
William started to produce/direct visual for music video from 2012.

References

1990 births
Living people
21st-century Malaysian male actors
Malaysian male film actors
Malaysian male television actors
Malaysian people of Tamil descent
People from Kedah